The Epistles of Manushchihr (Minocher) are a response to comments made by the author's brother on the subject of purification in Zoroastrianism.

When Zadsparam, who was the high priest of Sirjan which is located near Kerman, proposed certain new precepts, the public were not ready for change and were very unsatisfied. Therefore, they decided to complain to the high priest's older brother Manuschchihr, who was the high priest of Kerman.

In response, Manushchihr issued three epistles in the issue:
A reply to the complaining people
an expostulation with his brother
a public decree condemning the new precepts of his younger brother as unlawful innovations.

The first epistle is dated March 15, 881; the third is dated June–July 881. This book contains almost 9000 words. Manushchihar is the author of another major Pahlavi book named the 'Dadestan-i Denig'.

External links
English translation
Pahlavi original

Zoroastrian texts
9th-century books